Omar Kreim (born 10 February 1995) is a former professional footballer who played as a midfielder.

Early life
Kreim was born in Casablanca, Morocco and moved to Montreal, Quebec at age seven. He played youth soccer with FS Salaberry in Quebec. He then joined their senior team in the top amateur division, Ligue de soccer élite du Québec, winning the LSEQ Ballon d'Or in 2016, while also attending the Université de Montréal, playing for the Carabins men's soccer team. In 2017, he repeated as the LSEQ Ballon d'Or winner and also won the provincial university title with the Carabins. In 2018, he captured the national title with the Carabins, earning MVP honours.

Club career
In 2019, he played with AS Blainville in the Première Ligue de soccer du Québec.

Shortly after graduating university, on 28 November 2019, Kreim signed his first professional contract with Canadian Premier League side HFX Wanderers. However, his debut was delayed due to the COVID-19 pandemic, which postponed the start of the 2020 CPL season. On August 30, he scored his first goal, scoring a free kick in stoppage time to earn his team a point in a 1-1 draw against York9 FC. He re-signed with the club for the 2021 season. He retired after the 2021 season, due to injury issues, after suffering a concussion early in the 2021 season.

Personal
Kreim graduated from the Université de Montréal with a law degree.

Honours
HFX Wanderers
 Canadian Premier League
Runners-up: 2020

References

External links
Montreal Carabins profile

Telegram profile

1995 births
Living people
Association football midfielders
Moroccan footballers
Canadian soccer players
Footballers from Casablanca
Soccer players from Montreal
Naturalized citizens of Canada
Université de Montréal alumni
HFX Wanderers FC players
Première ligue de soccer du Québec players
Canadian Premier League players
A.S. Blainville players
CS Monteuil players